The 2022 Campeonato Ecuatoriano de Fútbol Serie B, known as the LigaPro Betcris Serie B 2022 for sponsoring purposes, was the 64th season of the Serie B, Ecuador's second tier football league, and the fourth under the management of the Liga Profesional de Fútbol del Ecuador (or LigaPro). The season began on 15 March and ended on 30 October 2022.

Teams
10 teams competed in the season. LDU Portoviejo and Atlético Porteño were relegated after finishing in the bottom two places of the aggregate table of the previous season, being replaced by the 2021 Segunda Categoría champions Libertad and runners-up Imbabura. Manta and Olmedo were relegated after finishing in the bottom two places of the aggregate table of the 2021 Serie A.

Team changes

Stadiums and locations

Personnel and kits

Managerial changes

Notes

League table

Results

Positions by round

Results by match played

Top scorers

Source: Ecuagol

Number of teams by province

See also
 2022 Ecuadorian Serie A
 2022 Segunda Categoría
 2022 Copa Ecuador

Notes

References

External links
 LigaPro's official website 
 Official webpage 
 Serie B summary (SOCCERWAY)

A
Ecuador
 
2
Second level football leagues of South America